The Soyuz/Vostok, also known as just Soyuz or Vostok, or by its GRAU index, 11A510 was an interim expendable carrier rocket used by the Soviet Union in 1965 and 1966. Two were launched with prototype US-A satellites.

The Soyuz/Vostok was launched from Site 31/6 at the Baikonur Cosmodrome. It consisted of the first stage and boosters from a Soyuz rocket combined with the second stage of the Vostok-2, and an unknown third stage. Along with the Voskhod-derived Polyot, it was built as an interim between the cancellation of the UR-200 development programme, and the introduction of the Tsyklon-2, which took over US-A launches once it entered service.

References 

Space launch vehicles of the Soviet Union
R-7 (rocket family)
Vehicles introduced in 1965